"Barcelona" is a song by English singer-songwriter George Ezra. It was released in the United Kingdom on 28 August 2015 through Columbia Records as the sixth and final single from his debut studio album Wanted on Voyage (2014).

Music video 
The official music video was directed by Ben Reid and uploaded to YouTube on 21 July 2015. The video has 18 million views as of April 2022.

Charts

Certifications

Release history

References 

George Ezra songs
2014 songs
2015 singles
Songs about cities
Songs written by Joel Pott
Songs written by George Ezra
Song recordings produced by Cam Blackwood